Conondale is a rural town and locality in the Sunshine Coast Region, Queensland, Australia.

Geography
The town is in the Sunshine Coast hinterland area.

History
The town takes its name from a pastoral run assigned by pastoralist Donald Tuach McKenzie when it took up the property on 6 October 1851. It is thought he named it after the Conon River in Ross and Cromarty, Scotland.

In November 1906, a sub-division of the former Conondale Station, the Conondale Estate, described as 14,000 acres in one of the best agricultural and dairying districts in the Commonwealth, was advertised for sale. The auctioneers offered to forward an illustrated lithograph to any address. As a new departure in the sub-division of estates, a butter factory was built by the vendors as part of the sale. However, the butter factory never operated and the building was later demolished, with the timbers used for the construction of a house at Moffat Beach.

Conondale Provisional School and Flagstone Creek Provisional Schools opened in September 1912 both on a half-time basis, meaning that a single teacher was shared between the two schools. In 1913 Flagstone Creek Provisional School was renamed Conondale South Provisional School. In 1915 Conondale South Provisional School was closed and Conondale Provisional School continued with the teacher on a full-time basis. It experienced occasional closures due to lack of students or unavailability of a teacher. In 1933 it became Conondale State School.

Conondale Post Office opened by 1949 (a receiving office or Telegraph office had been open from 1904) and closed in 1974.

Heritage listings
Conondale has a number of heritage-listed sites, including:

 Aherns Road: Conondale Timbers Sawmill

Education 
Conondale State School is a government primary (Prep-6) school for boys and girls at 1700 Maleny-Kenilworth Road. In 2017, the school had an enrolment of 92 students with 10 teachers (6 full-time equivalent) and 10 non-teaching staff (5 full-time equivalent). It includes a special education program.

Amenities 
The Sunshine Coast Regional Council operates a mobile library service which visits the school on Maleny-Kenilworth Road.

Crystal Waters ecovillage
Conondale is home to the Crystal Waters ecovillage which provides accommodation for 200 residents.  It was established formally in 1987 making it one of the first in Australia.

See also

 Conondale Range

References

External links
 
 Town map of Conondale, 1983

 
Towns in Queensland
Suburbs of the Sunshine Coast Region
Localities in Queensland